Ilosaarirock (also known as Transmission 10.1) is a live album by British progressive rock band Porcupine Tree, released in March 2009. It was sent out only to members of the "Residents of a Blank Planet" ticketing club and is not commercially available. It was recorded at the Ilosaarirock Festival in Finland on 14 July 2007, and is considered by the band to be one of the best concerts from the "Tour of a Blank Planet". It includes the band's complete performance remixed from the multitrack recording made by national Finnish radio. Although it contains a few familiar favorites, most of the concert consists of tracks from Fear of a Blank Planet. This was the first time that live versions of the Fear of a Blank Planet songs have been officially released. Due to a fault with the mastering on the first manufacturing run, a corrected replacement CD was also included inside the package.

Track listing

Personnel
Steven Wilson – vocals, guitar, piano, mixing
Richard Barbieri – keyboards, synthesizer
Colin Edwin – bass guitar
Gavin Harrison – drums
John Wesley – guitar, backing vocals
Lasse Hoile – cover photography 
Carl Glover – cover design

References

Porcupine Tree live albums
2004 live albums
Transmission (record label) live albums